Laser crystal may refer to:

 Active laser medium, the source of optical gain within a laser
 Bubblegram, a 3D image composed of points suspended in a medium, typically a plastic block